Novye Lapsary (Śĕnĕ Lapsar) is an urban locality (urban-type settlement) under the administrative jurisdiction of Leninsky City District of the town of republican significance of Cheboksary, the Chuvash Republic, Russia. Population:

References

Notes

Sources

Urban-type settlements in Chuvashia